Maxime Jeoffroy Eli Mokom Gawaka is former minister of disarmament in the Central African Republic, and leader of Anti-balaka, arrested in 2022 for his war crimes.

Life 
Mokom was born on 30 December 1978. In 2013 he was of cofounders of militant movement Anti-balaka. From 2013 to 2014 he committed multiples war crimes. On 10 December 2018 he was publicly indicted by International Criminal Court for murder, extermination, deportation or forcible transfer and displacement of civilian population, imprisonment or other severe deprivation of physical liberty, torture, persecution, enforced disappearance of persons, mutilation, intentionally directing attacks against the civilian population, intentionally directing attacks against buildings dedicated to religion, pillaging, enlistment of children under the age of 15 years and destruction of the adversary’s property.

On 15 December 2020 he joined Coalition of Patriots for Change led by former president François Bozizé. He ordered Anti-balaka fighters to attack Bangui in January 2021. In July 2021 he fled to N'Djamena in Chad. On 14 March 2022 he was surrendered to the International Criminal Court by Chadian authorities and transferred to The Hague.

References 

People indicted by the International Criminal Court
1978 births
Living people
Leaders of Anti-balaka